Cyphotilapia is a small genus of African cichlids endemic to Lake Tanganyika, with C. frontosa being roughly confined to the northern half of the lake and C. gibberosa roughly to the southern half.

These are a mouth-brooding cichlid with a rather small batch of fry each spawn. The mother will hold the fry in her mouth for about 3–4 weeks before finally releasing about 30-70 fry. These are slow-growing fish, which take up to 6 years to reach sexual maturity. They can live for up to 25 years.

Species
There are currently two recognized species in this genus:

 Cyphotilapia frontosa (Boulenger, 1906) (Humphead cichlid)
 Cyphotilapia gibberosa T. Takahashi & Nakaya, 2003

References

 
Pseudocrenilabrinae
Fish of Africa
Cichlid genera
Taxa named by Charles Tate Regan